Marcos Giralt Torrente (born 1968) is a Spanish writer.  Born in Madrid, he studied philosophy at the Universidad Autónoma de Madrid. His first book, a collection of short stories called Entiéndame, appeared in 1995. Since then, he has published three novels and three more short story collections. His literary output over two decades is relatively modest, but Giralt Torrente's work has met with notable critical success and numerous literary prizes. These include:

 1999 - Premio Herralde de Novela, for París.
 1999 - Premio Modest Furest i Roca, for Nada sucede solo.
 2011 - Premio Internacional de Narrativa Breve Ribera del Duero, for El final del amor.
 2011 - Premio Nacional de Narrativa, por Tiempo de vida.
 2014 - Premio Strega Europeo, for the Italian translation of Tiempo de vida.

Giralt Torrente has served as resident writer at the Academia Española in Rome, at Aberdeen University, and at the Santa Maddalena Foundation, among other places. He is a regular contributor to Babelia, the literary supplement of El Pais. His work has been translated into English, German, French, Italian and Portuguese.

References

Spanish male novelists
Spanish male short story writers
Spanish short story writers
20th-century Spanish novelists
21st-century Spanish novelists
1968 births
Writers from Madrid
Living people
Autonomous University of Madrid alumni
Spanish literary critics
20th-century short story writers
21st-century short story writers
20th-century Spanish male writers
21st-century Spanish male writers